Oh Uhtaek or Oh Woo-Taek (born June 29, 1955) is a Korean physiologist. He is also a professor at College of Pharmacy, Seoul National University. His research is largely known for Cardiac Pain and other Visceral Pain Mechanism and as well as cloning.

Education
1978 Seoul National University, College of Pharmacy, B. S.

1982 Seoul National University, College of Pharmacy, M. S.

1987 University of Oklahoma, School of Medicine, Department of Physiology, Ph. D.

Work
1987 - 1988: Postdoctoral Training, Marine Biomedical Institute, University of Texas, Medical Branch at Galveston
1988: Assistant, Associate, Professor, College of Pharmacy, SNU
1994 - 1995: Visiting professor, Department of Physiology, Rosalind Franklin University HSC/Chicago Medical School
1997: Director, Sensory Research Center, Creative Research Initiatives, SNU
1998 – 2003: Associate editor, Neuroscience Letters, Elsevier
1999 – 2000: Editor-in-chief, Archives of Pharmacal Research
2000 – 2000: Secretary general, Korean Society for Brain and Neural Science
2004 – 2004: Secretary general, Korean Society for Biochemistry and Molecular Biology
2004 – 2004: Secretary general, Federation of Asian Pain Societies
2004: Member of the Korean Academy of Science and Technology 
2005 – 2007:  Secretary general, Organizing Committee, 19th FAOBMB Seoul Conference
2007 - 2013: Treasurer, FAOBMB
2008 – 2013: Chairman, WCU Dept of Molecular Medicine & Biopharmaceutical Sciences
2011 - 2013: National R&D Review Board of the MEST, Board Member
2011 - 2013: Biomedical Technology Development Steering Committee of MEST, Chair 
2013: Chairman of the board, Institut Pasteur-Korea

Major Research Activities
2012: Cho H et al., The Calcium-activated Chloride Channel Anoctamin 1 acts as a Heat Sensor in Nociceptive Neurons. Nature Neuroscience (2012) 
2008: Yang YD et al., TMEM16A Confers Receptor Activated Calcium-dependent Chloride Conductance. Nature (2008) 
2002: Shin J et al., Bradykinin-12-lipoxygenase-VR1 signaling pathway for inflammatory hyperalgesia. Proc Natl Acad Sci USA (2002) 
2002: Cho H et al., Mechano-sensitive Ion Channels in Cultured Sensory Neurons of Neonatal Rats. J Neurosci  (2002) 
2000: Hwang SW et al., Direct activation of capsaicin receptors by products of lipoxygenases: Endogenous capsaicin-like substances. Proc Natl Acad Sci USA 
1996: Oh U et al., Capsaicin Activates a Non-selective Cation Channel in Cultured Neonatal Rat Dorsal-root Ganglion Neurons. J Neurosci

Awards
 2006: National Academy of Science Award (Korea)
 2009: Korea Science Award (Presidential Award)
 2010: Best Scientist and Engineer Award of Korea (Presidential Award)
 2019: Ho-Am Prize in Medicine

References

Academic staff of Seoul National University
South Korean physiologists
Living people
1955 births
Korea University alumni
Seoul National University alumni
University of Oklahoma alumni
Place of birth missing (living people)
Recipients of the Ho-Am Prize in Medicine